Chirappuram is a hamlet within the larger village Ayroor, in Pathanamthitta district in southern Kerala, India. It is about 4km east of the village capital, Cherukolpuzha. Chirappuram is basically a junction on the two roads: Thekkumlal -Mookkannur and Edappavoor -Vettikkadu. The junction has a few shops and a Sree Narayan Guru Mandiram. The 100 year old Edappavoor MTLP school and St Thomas Marthoma Church are just few hundred metres away from this junction.

References 

Villages in Pathanamthitta district